Hitakami is a country name found in ancient Japanese texts. There are different theories as to which country the word "Hitakami" may have represented. However, in works such as the  the word "Hitakami" was used to represent the northeastern regions of what is now Japan.

The name of the old Japanese province , which corresponds to modern-day Hidaka Subprefecture in Hokkaido, is derived from the name "Hitakami".

See also
Emishi

References

Geographic history of Japan